The Space Based Space Surveillance (SBSS) system is a planned United States Space Force constellation of satellites and supporting ground infrastructure that will improve the ability of the United States Department of Defense (DoD) to detect and track space objects in orbit around the Earth. The primary SBSS contractor, Boeing, characterizes some orbiting space objects as, "Potential future threats to the United States' space assets".

The SBSS development work is being conducted in coordination with the Space Situational Awareness Group in the Space Superiority Systems Wing of the Space and Missile Systems Center. The commander of the Space Situational Awareness Group believes the SBSS satellite operations center, "Will transform Space Situational Awareness by providing a gateway to a responsive, taskable sensor. This capability is key to enabling the event-driven operations concept of the future".

Pathfinder satellite 

The first "pathfinder" satellite of the SBSS system (SBSS 1, aka USA 216, COSPAR 2010-048A, SATCAT 37168) was successfully placed into orbit on board a Minotaur IV rocket on 26 September 2010 (UTC). Originally, the launch was scheduled for December 2008 but was rescheduled for Spring of 2009, and again delayed until 22 October 2009. The launch delays were caused by problems with the booster, and not the satellite itself. A launch expected for 8 July 2010  was also postponed. The program cost US$823 million, including satellite, payload, launch, and ground support. The satellite and payload contracts to Ball Aerospace & Technologies are approximately 40% of the total. It is designed to examine every spacecraft in geosynchronous orbit at least once a day.

The SBSS pathfinder satellite has a 30 cm telescope on a two axis gimbal with a 2.4 megapixel image sensor and has a projected mission duration of five and a half years.

Geosynchronous Space Situational Awareness Program 
The first two GSSAP spacecraft were launched in 2014, and a further two was launched on 19 August 2016 (USA-270 and USA-271). The first two were built by Orbital Sciences Corporation; their capabilities and development and construction budgets are classified. They operate in "near-geosynchronous orbit", The first launch was scheduled for 23 July 2014 aboard a United Launch Alliance Delta IV launch vehicle.

Even during the testing process these satellites were pressed into early service to fulfill critical needs.

On 12 September 2017, the third and fourth satellites were declared operational.

Two more satellites (GSSAP-5 and GSSAP-6) have been successfully launched on 21 January 2022 by a Atlas V launch vehicle.

See also 
 Air Force Space Surveillance System
 MiTEx

References 

Reconnaissance satellites
Spacecraft launched by Delta IV rockets
Equipment of the United States Space Force